is a very short Autobahn and connects the western part of Frankfurt am Main with the Alleenring. The A 648 is the most important way to the city and to the Frankfurt Trade Fair.

Exit list 

|-
| colspan="3"|

|-
|
|
| End of Autobahn 

|-
|colspan="3"|

|}

External links 

648
A648